The Social Democratic Power (PODEMOS) was a Bolivian political party based on pro-business goals.

History
Podemos is in fact the continuation of the Acción Democrática Nacionalista (ADN) of former president Hugo Banzer. Upon Banzer's death in 2002, former president Jorge Quiroga (2001-2002) became leader of the ADN, but apparently concluded that the name of the party was too associated with the life and thought of the ex-dictator. Thus, he changed the name of the organization to Podemos and ran as its presidential candidate in the 2005 elections. He finished a distant second to current president Evo Morales of MAS (Movement Toward Socialism). Even though Podemos is on the surface a new party, its structures, ideology, and supporters remain basically the same as those of the old ADN.

References 

Conservative parties in Bolivia
Defunct political parties in Bolivia
Nationalist parties in Bolivia
Bolivian nationalism
National conservative parties
Right-wing parties in South America